Xodus: The New Testament is the second album by Brooklyn-based hip hop group X Clan. Xodus is a sample-heavy ode to spiritualism and black nationalism. The album featured singles "Fire & Earth (100% Natural)" and "A.D.A.M."

Track listing
 All songs written by Jason Hunter, L. Robert Carson and Claude Gray.
 "Foreplay"
 "Cosmic Ark"
 "A.D.A.M."
 "Xodus"
 "F.T.P."
 "Fire & Earth (100% Natural)"
 "Holy Rum Swig"
 "Ooh, Baby"
 "Rhythm of God"
 "Verbal Papp"
 "Funk Liberation"

Samples

"Cosmic Ark"
"Funky Sensation" by Gwen McCrae 

"A.D.A.M."
"Mister Magic" by Grover Washington, Jr. 

"Xodus"
"Funky Worm" by Ohio Players
"Call Me D-Nice" by D-Nice 
"Buzzsaw" by The Turtles
"Prelude" by Parliament

"F.T.P."
"I Got It Made" by Special Ed 
"I Don't Know What It Is, But It Sure Is Funky" by Ripple

"Fire & Earth (100% Natural)"
"The Thrill Is Gone" by B.B. King 
"Hush, Somebody's Calling My Name" by Ry Cooder 
"Troglodyte" by Jimmy Castor

"Holy Rum Swig"
"Funky Drummer" by James Brown
"Brother Rapp" by James Brown
"Rise Above" by Black Flag

"Ooh, Baby"
"Impeach the President" by The Honey Drippers
"Love's in Need of Love Today" by Stevie Wonder 

"Funk Liberation"
"Atomic Dog" by George Clinton

Personnel
 Mike Ffrench, Winston Rosa, Prince Charles Alexander, Kenny Ortez, Jesse Torres - recording engineers
 Mike Ffrench, Winston Rosa, Prince Charles Alexander, Kenny Ortez, Jesse Torres - mixing
 George DuBose - photography, art direction
 Ron Jaramillo - design
 Dana Shimizu - design

Charts

Weekly charts

Year-end charts

References

1992 albums
X Clan albums
Polydor Records albums
Political music albums by American artists